Victoriya Viktorovna Kalinina (born 8 December 1988) is a Russian handball player for Rostov-Don and the Russian national handball team.

References

External links

1988 births
Living people
People from Maykop
Russian female handball players
Olympic handball players of Russia
Olympic medalists in handball
Olympic gold medalists for Russia
Handball players at the 2016 Summer Olympics
Handball players at the 2020 Summer Olympics
Medalists at the 2016 Summer Olympics
Medalists at the 2020 Summer Olympics
Olympic silver medalists for the Russian Olympic Committee athletes
Sportspeople from Adygea